Sex & Violins (also known on later US releases as Cotton Eye Joe (Sex & Violins)) is the debut studio album by Swedish Eurodance group Rednex, released on Jive Records in February 1995.

Content
Female vocals on the album are provided by Annika Ljungberg; due to a disagreement with the other band members, she left the band after the release of the album's fifth single, "Rolling Home", in 1996, to start a solo career. The album was a commercial success, including the hit dance single "Cotton Eye Joe".

For its US release, the album was retitled Cotton Eye Joe (Sex & Violins) and received new cover art – presumably due to the possible offensive nature of the original artwork, which depicted a person urinating into a cup. Initially, the album received an edited version of this cover, which removed both the person and the stream of urine. This would be substituted for wholly original artwork for a short time, which depicted a desert landscape warped by heat haze, but returned to the unedited original cover after a single pressing.

Critical reception
David Browne from Entertainment Weekly said, "For sheer audaciousness, it’s not surprising that the record is garnering such attention. Where else can you hear a barn-dance staple gone techno, complete with dance-diva wailing and manic banjos and fiddles?" Neil Spencer from The Observer wrote, "Swedish barn-dance disco: an initially amusing joke (chart-topping "Cotton Eye Joe") repeated to the point of inanity."

Track listing

Notes
  signifies a co-producer

Personnel
 Accordion – Ari Haatainen and Henrik Widén
 Banjo – Gary Johansson, General Custer, and Kjell Johansson
 Bass – Björn Lagberg
 Drums – Anders Lövmark, Animal, and Heffa
 Guitar – Anders Hellquist, Boba, Bonne Lövman, Clint Eastwood, and Henrik Jansson
 Steel guitar – Uffe Sterling
 Harmonica – Ove Sandberg
 Piano – Henrik Widén
 Violin – Bosse Nilsson
 Vocals – Anders Hansson, Annika Ljungberg, Björn Lagberg, Camena, Camilla Molinder, Chris Sylvan Stewart, Cool James, Currey, Göran Danielsson, Hanna Wannagárd, Henrik Widen, Hoss, Janne Ericsson, Jean-Paul Wall, Jeanette Söderholm, Joe Cartwright, Lotten Andersson, Ludde, Michelle Anenberg, Monte Reid, Pat Reiniz, Stefan Cevaco, Sir Een, Thomas Hegert, and Zeb Macahan
 Whistle – Jean-Paul Wall

Production
 Producers – Pat Reiniz, Janne Ericsson, Anders Hansson, Denniz Pop, Max Martin, David Millington, Stefan Sir Een, L. Teijo, Anders Hellquist, and Thomas Hegert
 Engineering assistant – Jacob Schultze

Charts

Weekly charts

Year-end charts

Sales and certifications

References

1995 debut albums
Rednex albums
Albums produced by Max Martin
Battery Records (dance) albums